Bad Company is a 1931 American pre-Code gangster film directed and co-written by Tay Garnett with Tom Buckingham based on Jack Lait's 1930 novel Put on the Spot. It stars Helen Twelvetrees and Ricardo Cortez. Told from the view of a woman, the working titles of this film were The Gangster's Wife and The Mad Marriage. Unlike many static early sound films, Garnett includes several scenes using a moving camera climaxing in a gigantic assault on an office building with both sides using heavy machine guns.

Plot
Rich and beautiful Helen King is about to marry Steve Carlyle, a wealthy young professional.  Unknown to Helen and her family, Steve is a legal advisor to a megalomaniac gangster Goldie Gorio.

Steve wishes to leave the rackets but Goldie reintroduces him to his future father-in-law, a rival gangster where both parties see the marriage as a symbol of peace and an end of violence in their transactions.  Steve remains with Goldie and fills in for him to a visit to a rival gangster's boat where he is ambushed and nearly killed by their machine gun.  Helen vows revenge on Goldie.

Cast
Helen Twelvetrees  ...  Helen King
Ricardo Cortez  ...  Goldie Gorio
John Garrick  ...  Steve Carlyle
Paul Hurst  ...  Goldie's Butler
Frank Conroy  ...  Markham King
Harry Carey  ...  McBaine
Frank McHugh  ...  Doc
Kenneth Thomson  ...  Barnes
Arthur Stone ... Dummy
Emma Dunn ... Emma
William V. Mong ... Henry
Edgar Kennedy  ...  Buffington

(as per AFI database.)

Critical reception
In a contemporary review in The New York Times, critic Mordaunt Hall wrote that the film was "good enough entertainment of its kind," that "machine guns, on the whole, provide the most effective bits," and that "Ricardo Cortez plays the part effectively [...] if he becomes a little ludicrous in his more savage moods, splitting a man's head for suggesting that a dinner coat ordinarily has but one button, turning homicidal lunatic when a cat pushes a plaster bust of himself off the table - he is at least honestly amusing." A modern review by author and critic Danny Reid reported that the film "gives us an underworld fully realized and utterly perverse [...] the violence is frankly shocking for the time, and the direction lively and playful" and "it’s the utter insanity of Cortez’s Capone-esque magnate you’ll take away with you."

See also
 List of American films of 1931
 Harry Carey filmography

References

External links

1931 films
1931 crime drama films
American crime drama films
1930s English-language films
Films directed by Tay Garnett
RKO Pictures films
Films based on American novels
American black-and-white films
Films about organized crime in the United States
Films scored by Arthur Lange
1931 directorial debut films
1930s American films